One ship and three submarines of the Polish Navy have been named ORP Sokół (Polish: "Falcon"):

 Sokół, a tugboat launched in 1920 and disposed of in 1957.
 , a  launched in 1940 and leased to Poland the same year. She served during World War II and was returned to Britain in 1945 as HMS Urchin. She was scrapped in 1949.
 , a  purchased from the Soviet Union
She was transferred to Poland in 2002 and is currently serving.

See also 
 Sokół (disambiguation)

Polish Navy ship names